JøKleBa (establishesd 1990 in Oslo, Norway) is a Norwegian Jazz band with a free improvising expression.

All the band members are still very active in different projects, but in recent years has played very few concerts as JøKleBa, but on the tenth anniversary of Finsejazz they excited the Winter Jazz Audience. In 2011 they got into a new active period with festival appearances and a new album, Nu Jøk?.

Band members
Per Jørgensen – trumpet, guitar, percussion, vocals
Audun Kleive – drums, keyboards, percussion, vocals
Jon Balke – keyboards, percussion, vocals

Discography
 1991: On and On (Odin)
 1992: JøKleBa! (Odin)
 1996: JøKleBa Live! (Curling Legs)
 2011: Nu Jøk? (EmArcy, Universal Norway)
 2014: Outland (ECM)

References

External links

Norwegian jazz ensembles
Musical groups established in 1990
1990 establishments in Norway
Musical groups from Oslo